Lebedev, or Lebedeva (feminine; Ле́бедева) is a common Russian family name derived from the word лебедь (lebed, meaning "swan").

Geographical distribution
As of 2014, 83.5% of all known bearers of the surname Lebedev were residents of Russia (1:1,150), 5.5% of Ukraine (1:5,476), 2.8% of Belarus (1:2,295), 2.5% of Uzbekistan (1:8,343) and 2.4% of Kazakhstan (1:4,862).

In Russia, the frequency of the surname was higher than national average (1:1,150) in the following federal subjects:

 1. Kostroma Oblast (1:157)
 2. Ivanovo Oblast (1:289)
 3. Tver Oblast (1:291)
 4. Yaroslavl Oblast (1:379)
 5. Jewish Autonomous Oblast (1:476)
 6. Nizhny Novgorod Oblast (1:516)
 7. Mari El (1:521)
 8. Vologda Oblast (1:563)
 9. Vladimir Oblast (1:619)
 10. Leningrad Oblast (1:677)
 11. Novgorod Oblast (1:685)
 12. Amur Oblast (1:739)
 13. Udmurtia (1:761) 
 14. Saint Petersburg (1:773)
 15. Pskov Oblast (1:838)
 16. Moscow Oblast (1:861)
 17. Volgograd Oblast (1:900)
 18. Murmansk Oblast (1:925)
 19. Chukotka Autonomous Okrug (1:934)
 20. Belgorod Oblast (1:976)
 21. Kirov Oblast (1:983)
 22. Kaliningrad Oblast (1:998)
 23. Voronezh Oblast (1:1,010)
 24. Irkutsk Oblast (1:1,018)
 25. Smolensk Oblast (1:1,027)
 26. Khabarovsk Krai (1:1,033)
 27. Magadan Oblast (1:1,099)
 28. Arkhangelsk Oblast (1:1,117)
 29. Sakhalin Oblast (1:1,120)
 30. Kemerovo Oblast (1:1,146)

People
Alexander Lebedev (born 1959), Russian businessman and politician
Aleksandr Lebedev (biochemist), Russian biochemist
Alexander Pavlovich Lebedev (1918–1943), Soviet army officer and Hero of the Soviet Union
Alexey Lebedev (1924–1993), Russian tubist and composer
Aleksey Vladimirovich Lebedev (born 1973), Russian scriptwriter and director. Main scriptwriter of the Kikoriki series.

Alina Lebedeva (born 1985), attacked Prince Charles of the United Kingdom in 2001
Andrey Lebedev (footballer) (born 1963), Soviet and Russian footballer
Andrey Lebedzew (born 1991), Belarusian footballer
Artemy Lebedev (born 1975), Russian graphic designer and founder of Art. Lebedev Studio
Arthur Lebedev (born 1936), Russian neurophysiologist
Denis Lebedev (born 1979), Russian boxer
Dmitri Lebedev (businessman) (born 1968), CEO of Rossiya Bank
Dmitry Lebedev (general) (1872–1935), Russian Estonian military commander, general
Dzmitry Lebedzew (born 1986), Belarusian footballer
Evgeny Lebedev (born 1980), newspaper publisher
 Evgeny Lebedev (1917–1997), Russian actor
Gerasim Lebedev (1749–1817), Russian Indologist
Gennady Lebedev (1957–2004), Russian economist, businessman and politician
Ivan Lebedeff (1894–1953), Russian-American film actor
Ivan Lebedev (a.k.a. Jean Lébédeff), (1884–1972), Russian-French painter and printmaker (article in French Wikipedia)
Ivan Lebedev (born 1959), Russian – American artist and photographer
Klavdy Lebedev (1852–1916), Russian painter
Konstantin Lebedev (1910–1949), Soviet soldier and Hero of the Soviet Union
Natalya Lebedeva (born 1949), Russian athlete
Nikolai Alexandrovich Lebedev (1914–1942), Soviet army officer and Hero of the Soviet Union
Nikolai Andreevich Lebedev (1919–1982), mathematician
Pavel Lebedev (born 1982), Russian pairs figure skater
Platon Lebedev (born 1956), Russian businessman
Pyotr Lebedev (1866–1912), Russian physicist
Sergey Lebedev (disambiguation) – several people
Tatyana Lebedeva (born 1976), Russian athlete
Valentin Lebedev (born 1942), Russian cosmonaut and double Hero of the Soviet Union
Vasily Lebedev-Kumach (1898–1949), Russian poet
Vladimir Lebedev (artist) (1891–1967), Russian painter and graphic artist
Vyacheslav Ivanovich Lebedev (1930–2010), Russian mathematician, known for the Lebedev quadrature method
Yevgeniy Lebedev (born 1981), Russian sprint athlete
Yevgeni Lebedev (1917–1997), Russian actor, People's Artist of the USSR
Yuri Lebedev (born 1951), Russian former ice hockey player

Fictional characters
Juan Ivanovich Lebedev, fictional character from Deus Ex
Lukian Timofyevich Lebedev, fictional character from Dostoevsky's novel The Idiot
N. A. Lebedev, fictional character from S.T.A.L.K.E.R.: Clear Sky game

See also
The Lebedev Physical Institute and the Lebedev Institute of Precision Mechanics and Computer Engineering which are named after Pyotr and Sergei, respectively.
Pyotr Lebedev (research vessel)

References

Russian-language surnames
Surnames of Russian origin